Denzil is a village in the Canadian province of Saskatchewan within the Rural Municipality of Eye Hill No. 382 and Census Division No. 13.

History 
Denzil incorporated as a village on May 3, 1911.

Demographics 

See also 

 List of communities in Saskatchewan
 Villages of Saskatchewan

References

External links

Villages in Saskatchewan
Eye Hill No. 382, Saskatchewan
Division No. 13, Saskatchewan